Throughout this period, Hockey Night in Canada studio shows were still originate on-site including Stanley Cup Finals. Dave Hodge (until 1986) and Ron MacLean and Don Cherry (since 1987) hosted the Toronto Maple Leafs games, and Dick Irvin Jr. hosted the Montreal Canadiens games and The Fisher Report at the Forum in Montreal with newspaper columnist Red Fisher. Steve Armitage hosts the Vancouver Canucks games, Gary Arthur hosted the Calgary Flames games, and John Wells hosted the Edmonton Oilers games. Later on, Chris Cuthbert hosted either the Calgary Flames or Edmonton Oilers games from Alberta. Furthermore, Howie Meeker used his telestrator for Western based games, and Brian McFarlane hosted the Winnipeg Jets, Montreal Canadiens, or games in the United States. This allowed player and coach interviews during the intermissions. Since 1987, Ron MacLean and Don Cherry hosted Coach's Corner, a show that was broadcast across Canada.

Stanley Cup playoffs

Notes
On April 9, 1980, CBC carried the ACTRA awards ceremony. This caused Game 2 of the Hartford–Montreal playoff series to be televised only in French, the Edmonton-Philadelphia, and Toronto-Minnesota games to be shown only on local stations CITV in Edmonton and CHCH in Hamilton, respectively. The Vancouver-Buffalo game was televised by CBC regionally in British Columbia as usual, as the ACTRA awards show was tape-delayed into prime time on the west coast.
Aside from the 1982 Stanley Cup Finals, CBC's only other nationally televised postseason games from that year were the Edmonton-Los Angeles game (April 12), the Boston-Quebec game (April 23), the deciding game seven between them at Boston Garden (April 25), and the Vancouver-Chicago game (May 6). All other games were seen regionally.
CTV had the national rights for the 1986 Calgary-St. Louis playoff series, except in the Calgary market, for which CBC and Molson retained exclusive rights to. CTV was unable to televise Games 2 and 3 of this series due to prior commitments. Meanwhile, CBC was allowed to televise Games 2 and 3 to all of Alberta and British Columbia, but not nationally.
In 1987, the first round series was extended to a best-of-7 series. From 1980 to 1986, that round was a best-of-5, with each round after that was a best-of-7 series.
1988 – TSN aired the Edmonton-Winnipeg playoff series nationally under the Carling O'Keefe banner, except for Edmonton and Winnipeg markets where CBC retained exclusive rights through Molson exclusivity.
On April 18, 1988 (during Game 1 of the Montreal-Boston playoff series) at approximately 8:08 p.m. local time, there was a power outage in the province of Quebec. While darkness enveloped Montreal and the Forum itself, the Forum's reserve generators kicked into gear. The generators were only able to illuminate the rink surface with enough power to keep the game moving. Ultimately, CBC was left with no choice but to abandon coverage following the first period. 
That same day, Chris Cuthbert was assigned by CBC to report and provide updates on Game 1 of Washington-New Jersey playoff series. However, when the Quebec blackout affected CBC's coverage of the Game 1 of the Boston-Montreal playoff series, the network threw to him and the solitary camera beside him in his coverage position to work the rest of this game. The whole process was totally done off the cuff. In other words, there were no graphics, no replay capabilities, and no analyst.
CanWest-Global aired the 1988 Edmonton-Calgary playoff series nationally, except for the Edmonton and Calgary markets, where CBC retained exclusive rights.

See also
List of Hockey Night in Canada commentators

References

External links
Stanley Cup Playoffs on CBC - Google Search
Hockey Night in Canada

CBC Sports
Lists of National Hockey League broadcasters
National Hockey League on television